Tristram  may refer to:

Literature
 the title character of The Life and Opinions of Tristram Shandy, Gentleman, a novel by Laurence Sterne
 the title character of Tristram of Lyonesse, an epic poem by Algernon Charles Swinburne
"Tristram", a Pulitzer Prize-winning work by Edwin Arlington Robinson

Legendary characters
 Tristram or Tristan, a Knight of the Round Table in Arthurian legend
 Tristram the Younger,  last king of Lyonesse in the Italian romance I Due Tristani, son of the above

People
 Tristram (name), a list of people with the given name or surname

Other uses
 Tristram, a town in the books and games of the Diablo video game series

See also
 Tristram's Woodpecker, a bird
 Tristram's starling or Tristram's grackle, a bird
 Tristram's jird, a species of gerbil
 Sir Tristram (1971–1997), a Thoroughbred racehorse and sire
 RFA Sir Tristram (L3505), a Landing Ship Logistics of the Round Table class
 Tristam (disambiguation)
 Tristan (disambiguation)